= The First Galaxy G1 =

Board game

The First Galaxy G1 is a board game with a science fiction theme published by Hungry Owl Publications in 1985.

== Contents ==
The First Galaxy G1 is a game for 2–5 players in which the players fly rockets around the mapboard, and try to reassemble their space stations, which have been broken into pieces and scattered across a spiral galaxy.

=== Components ===
- mounted gameboard
- 5 rocket tokens
- 5 space stations (4 parts each)
- 56 Supply cards
- 60 Fuel cell pieces
- 1 Standard die
- 2 10-sided dice
- Rules

== Reception ==
Jon Conner reviewed The First Galaxy - G1 for Imagine magazine, and stated that "All in all this is not a serious game but if you feel like some fun which involves some tactical thinking (perhaps after a hard game of Starship Troopers) then you will probably enjoy The First Galaxy - G1."

== Reviews ==
- Space Voyager
